Slaughter is a 1972 blaxploitation film directed by Jack Starrett and starring Jim Brown as a former Green Beret captain seeking revenge for a murder. Stella Stevens, Rip Torn, Don Gordon and Cameron Mitchell co-star. This film was followed by a sequel the following year, Slaughter's Big Rip-Off (1973).

Plot summary 
After the father of Vietnam veteran and ex-Green Beret captain Slaughter (Jim Brown) is killed by a car bomb, he becomes obsessed with avenging the murder. He learns it was arranged by a Cleveland organized-crime gang and tracks down the mobster personally responsible, killing a Mafia member in the process. The murderer, however, manages to escape.

Slaughter gets arrested and charged with first-degree murder, but Treasury Department official Price (Cameron Mitchell) offers to drop all charges if he agrees to go to an unnamed South American country to capture the escaped mobster, who apparently has a super-computer that helps him run his crime empire.

Upon arriving, Slaughter meets up with two fellow agents, Harry (Don Gordon) and Kim (Marlene Clark), having previously known Kim. The mobster responsible for the murder of Slaughter's father is Dominic Hoffo (Rip Torn), right-hand man of kingpin Felice (Norman Alfe). Hoffo, a blatant racist and sociopath, instantly hates Slaughter, especially when his comare Ann (Stella Stevens), a professional working for the organization, makes it clear she's delighted to have been ordered by Felice to present herself to Slaughter as a peace offering.

Slaughter, having no intention of backing down from his vendetta, accepts Ann's offer with pleasure, and her loyalties quickly transfer to him. Numerous fights and gun battles ensue, with the hot-headed Hoffo eventually killing the more reasonable Felice and assuming command, beating Ann viciously for her disloyalty. After a climactic shootout and lengthy car chase, Slaughter succeeds in killing Hoffo by incinerating him  in a crashed vehicle.

Cast
 Jim Brown as Slaughter
 Stella Stevens as Ann Cooper
 Rip Torn as Dominic Hoffo	
 Cameron Mitchell as A. W. Price
 Don Gordon as Harry Bastoli
 Marlene Clark as Kim Walker
 Robert Phillips as Frank Morelli
 Marion Brash as Jenny
 Norman Alfe as Mario Felice
 Eddie LoRusso as Al "Little Al"	
 Buddy Garion as Eddie
 Roger Cudney as Gio
 Lance Winston as Intern
 Juan Jose Laboriel as Uncle	
 Francisca Lopez de Laboriel as Aunt

Filming 
Slaughter was generally a low-budget production film, which was typical of most blaxploitation films during this era. It was directed by Jack Starrett. Writers included Don Williams and Mark Hanna. The producer was Monroe Sachson. Filming was in Mexico City, Distrito Federal, Mexico under the American International Pictures production company. Interiors were shot at the Churubusco Studios. Its U.S. release date was August 16, 1972 in New York City.

In a May 2, 1972 interview with The Hollywood Reporter, producer Monroe Sachson noted that the film's locale had to be changed from Mexico to a non-specified country at the request of the Mexican censorship board, even though the film had been partially financed by Estudios Churubusco. Sachson complained that the censorship board was "totally against any reference to their country if it shows it in any bad light." The article reported that Churubusco provided one third of the film's $850,000 budget, the rest of which came from Sachson's production company, JayJen II, AIP and Slaughter 1 Limited Partnership."

Music
The music was principally done by Luchi De Jesus, as musical director/supervisor, for the original film. Manuel Topete was the sound designer. The theme associated with the film gives Slaughter its own unique sound that stuck around and made a significant presence in the Blaxploitation film genre. Ric Marlow also made contributions as a songwriter. No soundtrack LP was ever issued.

Title song
The theme song for Slaughter  was written and performed by Billy Preston, who at the time was enjoying a commercial breakthrough as a solo artist with his soul-funk instrumental hit "Outa-Space". When released as a single in the US in 1972, "Slaughter" peaked at number 50 on the Billboard Hot 100 and number 17 on Billboards R&B Singles chart. Preston's recording was later used by Quentin Tarantino in his 2009 film Inglourious Basterds.  It also plays during a bar-fight scene in Brian Helgeland's 2015 film Legend.

Reception
"Slaughter is a decent mix of sex and violence, with particularly well-done action scenes. It also has just the right amount of comedy. Highlighted by a funky music score and Billy Preston's downright awesome theme song, Slaughter delivers solid blaxploitation goods."  "This release is a bucket of dumb fun that benefits hugely from Brown's screen presence and by Starrett's energetic direction", according to a review made in May 2006.

"Slaughter features dated set-ups, stiff acting and horrifying dialogue. But it does have Jim Brown, who is on bada**. Brown has a lot of charisma and he is always interesting to watch. This is a guy who in the movie portrays the proper stare, walk, and sexual bravura for his role. In addition to the fact that this is a non-stop action flick, 'Slaughter' will please even the hardest fan of the exploitation films."

"Featuring a dynamic theme song by Billy Preston, Slaughter was a major box-office hit in 1972 and one of the most popular films of Jim Brown's screen career; it spawned a sequel, Slaughter's Big Rip-Off, which appeared in 1973."

"Just about every tough black actor was given the opportunity to create his own blaxploitation hero in the early 70s. Ron O'Neal had Superfly, Richard Roundtree had Shaft, Fred Williamson had Hammer and Jim Brown had Slaughter. Although the football player turned thespian had a handful of film roles going back to the mid-60s, Slaughter represents his first real starring vehicle. While not critical favorites by any means, Slaughter and its sequel Slaughter's Big Rip-Off are action-jammed fun in the typical AIP (American International Pictures) tradition."

Home video
Slaughter was released on DVD on January 9, 2001. Subtitles were available in Spanish and French. The DVD was only distributed in the U.S. and Canada by studio MGM (video and DVD). It has a runtime of approximately 90 minutes. It was released on Blu-ray on September 22, 2015 by Olive Films.

See also
 List of American films of 1972

References

External links

1972 films
Blaxploitation films
1970s action thriller films
American action thriller films
American International Pictures films
Films set in South America
Estudios Churubusco films
Films directed by Jack Starrett
Films shot in Mexico City
1970s English-language films
1970s American films